The 1964 Australian Drivers' Championship was open to drivers of Racing Cars complying with either the Australian National Formula or with the Australian 1½ Litre Formula.
The title was contested over a five-round series.
Round 1, Australian Grand Prix, Sandown Raceway, Victoria, 9 February
Round 2, South Pacific Trophy, Longford, Tasmania, 2 March
Round 3, Lakeside, Queensland, 13 September
Round 4, Craven Filter Trophy, Mallala Motor Sport Park, South Australia, 12 October
Round 5, Horden Trophy, Warwick Farm, New South Wales, 6 December
Points were awarded on a 9-6-4-3-2-1 basis to the top six Australian resident place-getters in each round with the championship winner awarded the 1964 CAMS "Gold Star".

Results

Championship results were as follows.

References

Australian Motor Racing Annual, No. 1 (1964)
Australian Motor Racing Annual, No. 2 (1965)
Australian Motor Sport, December 1964
CAMS Manual of Motor Sport, 1964
Official Programme, Sandown, 9 February 1964
Official Souvenir Programme, Mallala Motor Races, 12 October 1964
Racing Car News, August 1972 (Gold Star Guide)
Racing Car News, January 1965
Sports Car World, December 1964
The Official 50 Year History of the Australian Grand Prix, © 1986

External links
tasman-series.com
CAMS Manual
www.sergent.com.au

Australian Drivers' Championship
Drivers' Championship